Anatoly Mikhaylovich Havrylov (Ukrainian: Анатолій Михайлович Гаврилов; 3 August 1932 – 16 May 2021) was a Soviet and Ukrainian cinematographer. He won the Shevchenko National Prize in 1988 for the Cossacks cartoon series. He was an Honored Art Worker of Ukraine (2010).

Biography 
Anatoliy Havrylov was born on August 3, 1932 in Kyiv, Ukrainian SSR (now Ukraine).

In addition to his work on the "Cossacks" cartoon series beginning in 1967, some of his best-known works are the 1976 "Delo poruchaetsya detektivu Teddi", the 1969 "The Man Who Knew How to Work Miracles" ("Chelovek, kotoriy umel tvorit chudesa"), and the 1971 "The Wizard Oh" ("Volshebnik Okh").

Education 
In 1967, Anatoliy Havrylov entered the Gerasimov Institute of Cinematography in Moscow.

Since 1969, he studied at the National University of Theatre, Film and TV in Kyiv.

Career 
In 1950, he became an assistant to the film studio camera operator in the Kievnauchfilm and since 1955 he worked as an assistant of the camera operator of the animation department of Kievnauchfilm.

In 1988, he became a laureate of the Shevchenko National Prize of Ukraine for his work with film director Volodymyr Dakhno and character artist Eduard Kirych on the cartoon series, "Cossacks" about Zaporozhian Cossacks.

In 1967-2008, Havrylov was the camera operator of the Kievnauchfilm and Ukranimafilm.

In 1992-1995, he took the position of camera operator of cartoon studio "Borysfen".

During 1996-2021, Havrylov was a teacher at the National University of Theatre, Film and TV in Kyiv.

He was a Member of the Ukrainian Association of Cinematographers.

Anatoliy Havrylov died in Kyiv on 16 May 2021, aged 88.

References

Ukrainian cinematographers
Soviet cinematographers
1932 births
2021 deaths
Kyiv National I. K. Karpenko-Kary Theatre, Cinema and Television University alumni
Film people from Kyiv